Sarah Schaub (born June 13, 1983) is an American actress from Salt Lake City, Utah.

She has appeared in such productions as Stephen King's The Stand and A Home of Our Own with Kathy Bates. She is best known for playing Dinah Greene in the CBS drama Promised Land from 1996 to 1999, for which she garnered two Young Artist Awards for Best Performance in a TV Drama Series-Leading Young Actress (1998) and Best Performance in a TV Drama Series-Young Ensemble (1999). After the series ended, Schaub acted primarily in local theater.

Filmography

References

External links
http://www.imdb.com/title/tt0108941/fullcredits
http://www.imdb.com/title/tt0115325/awards

1983 births
American child actresses
American film actresses
Wesleyan University alumni
Living people
Actresses from Salt Lake City
20th-century American actresses
21st-century American actresses